Eddie Akita is a Ghanaian politician and a member of the 3rd Parliament of the 4th Republic of Ghana. He is also a former member of Parliament for Ledzokuku constituency of the Greater Accra Region of Ghana. Akita once served as Deputy Minister of Defence as well as a Minister of state in charge of fisheries in Ghana.

Early life 
Akita hails from Ledzokuku in the greater Accra Region of Ghana.

Politics 
Akita is a member of the 3rd Parliament and a politician of the New Patriotic Party who served for only one term in office. He contested in the 2000 Ghanaian general elections and won with 21,082 making 48.40% of the total votes cast. He lost in the delegate election of the New Patriotic Party and hence was not qualified to contest in the 2004 Ghanaian general elections.

References 

Living people
New Patriotic Party politicians
Ghanaian MPs 2001–2005
Government ministers of Ghana
People from Greater Accra Region
Year of birth missing (living people)